François Heersbrandt (born 12 December 1989 in Uccle, Belgium) is a Belgian swimmer. He competed in the 100 m butterfly event at the 2012 Summer Olympics and was eliminated in the semi-finals despite setting a new Belgian record (52.22) in his qualifying heat. Heersbrandt competed in the same event at the 2008 Summer Olympics but was eliminated after the qualifying heats.  At the 2016 Summer Olympics, he competed in the 50 m freestyle but did not progress beyond the first round.

At the 2011 European Short Course Swimming Championships, he won a bronze medal in the 4x50m freestyle and set a new Belgian record with a time of 1.25,83. His partners for the relay were Jasper Aerents, Emmanuel Vanluchene and Louis Croenen. Heersbrandt also holds the Belgian record for the 50m butterfly (23.66) and in the 50m butterfly and 100m butterfly on short course.

References

Living people
1989 births
People from Uccle
Belgian male butterfly swimmers
Belgian male freestyle swimmers
Olympic swimmers of Belgium
Swimmers at the 2008 Summer Olympics
Swimmers at the 2012 Summer Olympics
Swimmers at the 2016 Summer Olympics
Sportspeople from Brussels
20th-century Belgian people
21st-century Belgian people